"Clostridium ragsdalei" is an anaerobic, motile, gram-positive bacterium.

References

External links
 

Clostridiaceae
Gram-positive bacteria